The Czech Extraliga is the name of the professional handball league of Czech Republic.

Competition Format 

The season begins with a regular season between the twelve teams. The first eight teams qualifies for the play-offs, while the last four plays a relegation round.

Naming and sponsorship 
The name of the league is leased to a general sponsor and changes frequently.
 1993 - 1995: 1.liga
 1995 - 2007: Extraliga 
 2007 - 2011: Zubr extraliga 
 2011 - 2014: Tipgames extraliga
 2014 - 2015: Triglav pojišťovna extraliga 
 2015 - 2020: Extraliga 
 2020 - 2022: STRABAG Rail Extraliga
 2022 - current: Chance Extraliga

Current teams

Teams for season 2022–23

HK FCC Město Lovosice
Talent Plzeň 
HCB Karviná
HC Dukla Prague
HC ROBE Zubří
SKP Frýdek-Místek 
KH Kopřivnice
TJ Cement Hranice 
TJ Sokol Nové Veselí
SKKP Handball Brno
O2xyworld HBC Jičín 
HBC JVP Strakonice 1921
SHC Maloměřice Brno

Extraliga Past Champions

 1994 : HC Dukla Prague
 1995 : HC Dukla Prague (2)
 1996 : Cabot Zubří
 1997 : Cabot Zubří (2)
 1998 : Kovopetrol Plzeň
 1999 : Kovopetrol Plzeň (2)
 2000 : HCB OKD Karviná
 2001 : HCB OKD Karviná (2)
 2002 : HCB OKD Karviná (3)
 2003 : SKP Frýdek-Místek
 2004 : HCB OKD Karviná (4)
 2005 : HCB OKD Karviná (5)
 2006 : HCB OKD Karviná (6)
 2007 : HCB OKD Karviná (7)
 2008 : HCB OKD Karviná (8)
 2009 : HCB OKD Karviná (9)
 2010 : HCB OKD Karviná (10)
 2011 : HC Dukla Prague (3) 
 2012 : HC Gumárny Zubří (3)
 2013 : HBC Ronal Jičín
 2014 : SSK Talent M.A.T. Plzeň (3)
 2015 : SSK Talent M.A.T. Plzeň (4)
 2016 : SSK Talent M.A.T. Plzeň (5)
 2017 : HC Dukla Prague (4) 
 2018 : HCB OKD Karviná (11)
 2019 : SSK Talent M.A.T Plzeň (6)
 2020 : not awarded
 2021 : SSK Talent M.A.T Plzeň (7)

EHF coefficient ranking
For season 2019/20, see footnote

16. (17)  Eredivisie (16.40)
17.  (18)  Handball Liga Austria (13.00)
18.  (20)  Extraliga (12.56)
19.  (19)  Handball League of Serbia (9.10)
20.  (21)  Swiss Handball League (8.20)

External links
 Official website

References

SM-Liiga
Handball leagues in Europe
Sports leagues established in 1993
1993 establishments in the Czech Republic
Professional sports leagues in the Czech Republic